Neptis continuata, the continuous sailer, is a butterfly in the family Nymphalidae. It is found in eastern Nigeria, Cameroon, Gabon, the Republic of the Congo, the Democratic Republic of the Congo, western Uganda and possibly Sierra Leone.

References

Butterflies described in 1892
continuata
Butterflies of Africa